John F. Furey (April 8, 1906 – December 22, 1973) was an American lawyer and politician from New York.

Early life and education
John F. Furey was born on April 8, 1906. He attended Boys High School and Columbia College; and graduated from Fordham Law School in 1929.

Career
Furey practiced law at 32 Court Street in Brooklyn, New York City.

New York State Constitutional Convention
Furey was a delegate to the New York State Constitutional Convention of 1938. He was District Leader of the Sunset Park Democratic Organization from 1939 to 1958.

New York State Assembly
On March 11, 1941, he was elected to the New York State Assembly (Kings County, 7th D.), to fill the vacancy which resulted from the resignation of William Kirnan. Furey was re-elected twice and remained in the State Assembly until 1946, sitting in the 163rd, 164th and 165th New York State Legislatures. On February 20, 1946, he married Mary E. Downing, and they had two children: Mary and John. In November 1946, Furey ran for the State Senate, but was defeated by Republican C. Corey Mills. In November 1948, Furey defeated Mills who ran for re-election.

New York State Senate
Furey was a member of the New York State Senate from 1949 to 1956, sitting in the 167th, 168th, 169th and 170th New York State Legislatures. In November 1956, he ran for re-election, but was defeated by Republican William T. Conklin.

New York City Magistrate
In April 1958, Furey was appointed by Mayor Robert F. Wagner, Jr. as a New York City Magistrate. In 1962, the City Magistrates became Judges of the New York City Criminal Court. He was re-appointed in 1967 by Mayor John V. Lindsay.

Inquiry
In 1968, Furey was subject of an inquiry, and his removal from the bench was demanded, because he had allegedly given his tacit approval of disruptive court tactics by Black Panther suspects. Nothing came of it, and Furey remained on the bench until his death in 1973.

Death
He died on December 21, 1973.

Sources

1906 births
1973 deaths
Democratic Party New York (state) state senators
Democratic Party members of the New York State Assembly
Politicians from Brooklyn
New York (state) state court judges
Columbia College (New York) alumni
Fordham University School of Law alumni
20th-century American lawyers
20th-century American judges
Boys High School (Brooklyn) alumni
20th-century American politicians